Coats is a city in Pratt County, Kansas, United States.  As of the 2020 census, the population of the city was 68.

History
Coats was founded in about 1887 by William A. Coats, and named for him. Coats was incorporated as a city in 1909.

The first post office in Coats was established in June 1887.

Geography
Coats is located at  (37.511148, -98.825388).

Climate
The climate in this area is characterized by hot, humid summers and generally mild to cool winters.  According to the Köppen Climate Classification system, Coats has a humid subtropical climate, abbreviated "Cfa" on climate maps.

Demographics

2010 census
As of the census of 2010, there were 83 people, 31 households, and 21 families residing in the city. The racial makeup of the city was 95.2% White, 1.2% from other races, and 3.6% from two or more races. Hispanic or Latino of any race were 8.4% of the population.

There were 31 households, of which 32.3% had children under the age of 18 living with them, 54.8% were married couples living together, 9.7% had a female householder with no husband present, 3.2% had a male householder with no wife present, and 32.3% were non-families. 25.8% of all households were made up of individuals, and 25.8% had someone living alone who was 65 years of age or older. The average household size was 2.68 and the average family size was 3.24.

The median age in the city was 37.8 years. 25.3% of residents were under the age of 18; 4.7% were between the ages of 18 and 24; 22.8% were from 25 to 44; 32.4% were from 45 to 64; and 14.5% were 65 years of age or older. The gender makeup of the city was 48.2% male and 51.8% female.

2000 census
As of the census of 2000, there were 112 people, 51 households, and 32 families residing in the city. The racial makeup of the city was 95.54% White, 0.89% Native American, 0.89% from other races, and 2.68% from two or more races. Hispanic or Latino of any race were 4.46% of the population.

There were 51 households, out of which 25.5% had children under the age of 18 living with them, 60.8% were married couples living together, 3.9% had a female householder with no husband present, and 35.3% were non-families. 35.3% of all households were made up of individuals, and 25.5% had someone living alone who was 65 years of age or older. The average household size was 2.20 and the average family size was 2.85.

In the city, the population was spread out, with 25.0% under the age of 18, 5.4% from 18 to 24, 21.4% from 25 to 44, 19.6% from 45 to 64, and 28.6% who were 65 years of age or older. The median age was 44 years. For every 100 females, there were 96.5 males. For every 100 females age 18 and over, there were 78.7 males.

The median income for a household in the city was $23,750, and the median income for a family was $29,583. Males had a median income of $26,250 versus $17,188 for females. The per capita income for the city was $12,985. There were 20.0% of families and 20.9% of the population living below the poverty line, including 23.5% of under eighteens and 18.4% of those over 64.

References

Further reading

External links
 Coats - Directory of Public Officials
 USD 438, local school district
 Coats city map, KDOT

Cities in Kansas
Cities in Pratt County, Kansas
1887 establishments in Kansas
Populated places established in 1887